Élémir Bourges (26 March 1852, Manosque, Alpes-de-Haute-Provence – 13 November 1925) was a French novelist. A winner of the Goncourt Prize, he was also a member of the Académie Goncourt. Bourges, who accused the Naturalists of having "belittled and deformed man", was closely linked with the Decadent and Symbolist modes in literature. His works, which include the 1884 novel Le Crépuscule des dieux ("the Twilight of the Gods"), were informed by both Richard Wagner and the Elizabethan dramatists.

Bibliography
Sous la hache (1883)
Le Crépuscule des dieux (1884)
Les oiseaux s’envolent et les fleurs tombent (1893)
L'Enfant qui revient (1905)
La Nef (1904–1922)

Notes

External links
Works by Élémir Bourges at the Bibliotheque Nationale
 
 

1852 births
1925 deaths
People from Manosque
19th-century French novelists
20th-century French novelists
20th-century French male writers
Burials at Père Lachaise Cemetery
French male novelists
19th-century French male writers